Rokken Station (六軒駅) is the name of two train stations in Japan:

Rokken Station (Gifu)
 Rokken Station (Mie)